Neither One of Us is the ninth studio album by American R&B quartet Gladys Knight & the Pips, released in early 1973 (see 1973 in music) by Motown Records on the Soul Records label.

The label released the album shortly after the group left the label for Buddah Records while the title track was rising up the charts. That song eventually peaked at No. 2 on the US Pop Charts, and reached the top spot on the R&B Charts. Motown issued another single, "Daddy Could Swear, I Declare", in April of the year. "Daddy" was a Top 20 hit on the Billboard Hot 100, reaching No. 19, and nearly topped the Soul Charts as well, peaking at No. 2. By that point, the group had released their first Buddah single, "Where Peaceful Waters Flow".

Neither One of Us became the band's most successful album on the Billboard Top LPs chart, peaking at number nine (it would later be tied by their 1973 album Imagination). It also topped the Top Soul LPs chart. Following the success of this album and the group's commercial acclaim at Buddah, Motown released three more albums of unreleased material.

Track listing

Personnel
Arrangers
Artie Butler - arrangement on "Neither One of Us (Wants to Be the First to Say Goodbye)"
Michael Omartian - arrangement on "Neither One of Us (Wants to Be the First to Say Goodbye)" and "Who Is She (And What Is She to You)?"
H. B. Barnum - arrangement on "It's Gotta Be That Way" and "Daddy Could Swear, I Declare"
David Van De Pitte - "For Once in My Life" and "Don't It Make You Feel Guilty"
Tom Baird - arrangement on "This Child Needs Its Father"
James Anthony Carmichael - arrangement on "And This Is Love"
Paul Riser - arrangement on "Can't Give It Up No More"

Charts

Album

Singles

See also
List of number-one R&B albums of 1973 (U.S.)

References

External links
Neither One of Us at Discogs

Gladys Knight & the Pips albums
1973 albums
Motown albums
Albums produced by Hal Davis
Albums produced by Johnny Bristol
albums arranged by H. B. Barnum
albums arranged by Paul Riser